Hibernian Women's Football Club is a women's football team based in Edinburgh that plays in the Scottish Women's Premier League, the top division of women's football in Scotland. They were officially integrated as a department of Hibernian F.C. in 2022, having previously been linked less formally via their community foundation, using the club's training facilities and colours.

History
Founded in 1997 by Iain Johnston and Paul Johnston, for the initial two seasons of its existence the club was under the auspices of Preston Athletic. The name changed to Hibernian Ladies in 1999 and they became one of the leading women's teams in Scotland. After being temporarily voted out of the Scottish Women's Premier League by its other member clubs in 2005 after officials failed to attend the body's AGM (subsequently downgraded to a warning and small fine), in 2006–07 Hibs secured a domestic double, finishing the league campaign with a 100% record. The club has won the league championship three times and then represented Scotland in the UEFA Women's Cup. In that competition they failed to progress beyond the first round in each instance, finishing second twice and third once in the group stage.

Hibernian won the Women's Scottish Cup in 2010, for the fifth time in eight years. The team's success in the national cup competition was in contrast to their male affiliate, who had not won the Scottish Cup for over a century until their victory in 2016.

In January 2011, six Hibernian players were called into the Scotland women's national football team. In May 2011 Hibernian beat local rivals Spartans 5–2 in the Scottish Women's Premier League Cup final.

Hibs won domestic cup doubles in 2016, 2017 and 2018.

Ahead of the 2020 season, the club was rebranded as Hibernian Women and offered their first part-time professional contracts. The senior team was fully integrated into the men's club in July 2022, with the youth sides still being run by the Hibernian Community Foundation.

Stadium 
For the 2011 season, Hibernian moved into Albyn Park, Broxburn, the home of junior football club Broxburn Athletic. The club had previously played its home matches on the training ground of Hibernian F.C. in East Lothian. Hibs then used Ainslie Park in Edinburgh as their regular home ground for several seasons, but have also played one-off games at Easter Road. They moved into the Almondvale Stadium in Livingston for the 2021–22 season.

The team moved into the refurbished Meadowbank Stadium in July 2022, as part of a wider partnership between Hibernian and F.C. Edinburgh.

Current squad

Out on loan

Former players
For notable former players, see :Category:Hibernian W.F.C. players.

Coaches
Willie Kirk (2011–13)
Chris Roberts (2014–17)
Kevin Milne (2017–18)
Grant Scott (2018–2019)
Dean Gibson (2020–present)

Achievements

Scottish Women's Premier League
Winners (3): 2003–04, 2005–06, 2006–07
Runners-up (9): 2002–03, 2004–05, 2007–08, 2013, 2015, 2016, 2017, 2018, 2019
Scottish Women's Cup
Winners (8): 2003, 2005, 2007, 2008, 2010, 2016, 2017, 2018
Runners-up (4): 2011, 2013, 2015, 2019
Scottish Women's Premier League Cup
Winners (7): 2005, 2007, 2011, 2016, 2017, 2018, 2019
Runners-up (5): 2007, 2009, 2014, 2015, 2022

European history
Hibernian have participated in six seasons of UEFA competitions.

References

External links
 

 
Women's football clubs in Scotland
Football in West Lothian
1997 establishments in Scotland
Association football clubs established in 1997
Scottish Women's Premier League clubs
Football clubs in Edinburgh
Hibernian F.C.